Lymire edwardsii, the rubber tree caterpillar or Edwards' wasp moth, is a moth of the subfamily Arctiinae. It was described by Augustus Radcliffe Grote in 1881. It is found in southern Florida, United States.

The wingspan is 35–40 mm. The wings are bluish gray. Adults are on wing year round.

The larvae feed on Ficus species, including Ficus pedunculata, Ficus altissima, Ficus aurea, Ficus auriculata, Ficus benghalensis, Ficus benjamina, Ficus continifolia, Ficus elastica, Ficus lyrata, Ficus retusa and Ficus rubiginosa. They feed on leaf margins or create holes in the leaves. Full-grown larvae are pale yellow with four white stripes and a reddish/orange and white head.  Pupation takes place on various (non-host) plants.

References

Euchromiina
Moths described in 1881